Nestocoelius is a monotypic Australasian genus of potter wasps.

References

Biological pest control wasps
Potter wasps
Monotypic Hymenoptera genera